The Mayor of Hargeisa is the chief executive of the city of Hargeisa, the capital and largest city of Somaliland. The current mayor is Abdikarim Ahmed Mooge, who took office on 17 June 2021.

List of mayors

See also

 Mayor of Berbera
 Mayor of Las Anod
 Mayor of Burao
 Mayor of Erigavo
 Mayor of Borama

References